Barbados has a number of plantations and great house properties that were instrumental in the islands' booming sugar trade.  Families often owned several plantations and the acreage of each often changed when owners bought and/or sold plots of nearby land. The sizes quoted here had been recorded as of 1915. After emancipation over half of the near 1000 plantation-estates became tenantry villages and remain villages to this day.  Many of the remaining properties are now protected by the Barbados National Trust and very few may have been passed down to current family members.

See also
List of plantations

References

External links
Chronicle Carbados - 1600s Barbados Public Records, Barbados Chronicle (rootsweb.ancestry.com)
1913 Barbados Plantations and Owners Names, creolelinks.com
Plantations & Sugar-works Barbados Handbooks 1912 - 1914

Houses in Barbados
Barbados
Barbados-related lists

Barbados